Hypsopygia mabokealis is a species of snout moth in the genus Hypsopygia. It was described by Patrice J.A. Leraut in 2006 and is known from Vietnam.

References

Moths described in 2006
Endemic fauna of Vietnam
Moths of Asia
Pyralini